Anekallu/Anekal is a small village near Uppala in Kasaragod district of Kerala state, India surrounded with forests.

Its a border place, shared among the Kerala and Karnataka. As it extend the thread of Diversity, we can witness  the people speak Kannada, Malayalam, and also Tulu and Konkani.

Location
Anekallu is located on the eastern border of Kerala with Karnataka state. It can be accessed by bus from Uppala or Hosangadi on the Mangalore-Calicut highway.

The village is the location of a bridge that separates the two states of Kerala and Karnataka.

Gallery

References

Villages in Kasaragod district